Maral Torkaman (Persian: مارال ترکمان; born November 26, 2002) is an Iranian futsal player. She was called up to the Under-14 national football team at the age of 11 and has been a regular member of the women's national football team since then.
In the summer of 2019, he accidentally and unexpectedly decided to participate in futsal and joined Saipa Tehran and became a student of Niloofar Ardalan; Presence in Saipa gave Maral Torkaman the opportunity to play alongside the best futsal players.

She reached an agreement with Nasr Fardis Karaj team for the Iranian Women's Futsal Premier League 2021 and became a member of this team.

Torkaman has a history of captaining the Iran women's national youth futsal team in the 2020 CAFA Championship. He performed well and was named tournament most valuable player.

Honors with National Team 
Championship in Cafa 2020

Football brother and sister 
Maral Torkaman and his brother Mehdi Torkaman are the only siblings who play at a high level in Iranian football. In recent years, Iranian football has seen more football brothers. But it has never been seen that a brother and sister can shine in the first level of football and make a name for themselves.

References 

2002 births
Living people
Iranian women's footballers
Iran women's international footballers
Iranian women's futsal players
Women's association footballers not categorized by position
People from Karaj
21st-century Iranian women